Fabiano Machado (born 28 May 1986) is a Brazilian professional racing driver.

Career

Karting
Machado began karting in 2003 and raced primarily in his native Brazil for the majority of his career.

Formula Three Sudamericana
Machado graduated to single-seaters, competing in the local Formula Three Sudamericana championship with Cesário Fórmula. He won four races and amassed another three podiums, finishing fourth in the standings. Machado remained with Cesário Fórmula into 2011, winning 17 of the season's 25 races to comfortably win the championship title.

GP3 Series
In 2012, Machado made his début in the GP3 Series with Marussia Manor Racing.

Racing record

Career summary

Complete GP3 Series results
(key) (Races in bold indicate pole position) (Races in italics indicate fastest lap)

References

External links
  
 

1986 births
Living people
Brazilian GP3 Series drivers
Formula 3 Sudamericana drivers
Manor Motorsport drivers